Mohammed Abdulrahman Ahmed Al Raqi Al Almoudi (born 4 February 1989) is an Emirati professional footballer who plays as a midfielder for the United Arab Emirates national team.

Personal life
Mohammed Abdulrahman is the brother of footballers Khaled Abdulrahman and Omar Abdulrahman.

Career statistics

Club

Notes

International
Scores and results list the United Arab Emirates' goal tally first.

References

External links
Mohammed Profile At *Al Ain Fc.net Official Site

1989 births
Living people
Emirati footballers
Emirati people of Yemeni descent
Al Ain FC players
Al-Wasl F.C. players
2015 AFC Asian Cup players
2019 AFC Asian Cup players
United Arab Emirates international footballers
Association football midfielders
UAE Pro League players
Naturalized citizens of the United Arab Emirates